Mame Bineta Sane (born 3 February 2000), also known as Mama Sané, is a Senegalese actress. She is best known for the role as 'Ada' in the supernatural romantic drama film Atlantics.

Personal life
She grew up in Thiaroye, a suburb of Dakar, Senegal. She did not receive a regular education from school. She started to work as an apprentice tailor in Thiaroye.

Career
She has not acted in any kind of drama before when she was selected for the lead role in 2019 film Atlantics directed by Mati Diop as her first feature film. Sane didn't really attend school either when Diop invite her to play the role. In the film, Sane played the lead role 'Ada', who is haunted by her lover, Souleiman, along with a boatload of other young men, is lost at sea.

The film had its premier in the capital of Dakar before its release in Senegal. The film had mainly positive reviews from critics and screened at several film festivals. The film later won the Grand Prix Award at the 2019 Cannes Film Festival. For her role, Sane later received a César nomination for Most Promising Actress in the 2020 César awards and was also nominated for the Lumières Award for Most Promising Actress in the 2020 Lumières awards and for the Black Reel Award for Female Outstanding Breakthrough Performance in the Black Reel Awards of 2020.

Filmography

References

External links
 

Living people
People from Dakar Region
2000 births
Senegalese actresses
Senegalese film actresses